The Minister of the Interior of Latvia is a member of the Cabinet of Ministers of Latvia, and is the political leader of the Ministry of the Interior of Latvia. Māris Kučinskis is the current minister since December 14th 2022.

 
Interior